Stade de Moroni is a multi-use stadium in Moroni, Comoros. It is currently used mostly for athletics competitions.  Next to it is a football stadium Stade de Beaumer.

Athletics (track and field) venues in the Comoros